Jerry Lynn Buchmeyer (September 5, 1933 – September 21, 2009) was an American lawyer and jurist who served as a United States district judge of the United States District Court for the Northern District of Texas in Dallas, Texas.

Early life and education

Born in Overton, Texas, on September 5, 1933, Buchmeyer received an Associate of Arts degree from Kilgore Junior College (now Kilgore College) in 1953, his Bachelor of Arts degree from the University of Texas at Austin in 1956, and his Bachelor of Laws from the University of Texas School of Law in 1957.

Career 
From 1958 to 1979, Buchmeyer worked in private law practice in Dallas at the law firm of Thompson & Knight.

Federal judicial service 
Buchmeyer was nominated by President Jimmy Carter on August 3, 1979, to a seat on the United States District Court for the Northern District of Texas vacated by Judge William McLaughlin Taylor Jr. He was confirmed by the United States Senate on October 4, 1979, and received his commission on October 5, 1979. He served as chief judge from 1995 to 2001. He assumed senior status on September 5, 2003. His service terminated on September 21, 2009, due to his death in San Marcos, Texas.

References

External links
 "Say What?!"
 Dallas Bar Association profile
 

1933 births
2009 deaths
People from Dallas
University of Texas alumni
University of Texas School of Law alumni
Texas lawyers
Judges of the United States District Court for the Northern District of Texas
United States district court judges appointed by Jimmy Carter
20th-century American judges
People from Overton, Texas